Floyd Central High School is a public high school in the New Albany-Floyd County Consolidated School Corporation and is located in Southern Indiana, in Floyds Knobs, an unincorporated area in Floyd County, Indiana.

In addition to Floyds Knobs, the school serves Galena, Georgetown and Greenville.

History
The school was built in 1967 and has had many expansions since then, including an auditorium. The school was formerly called "Floyd Central Junior-Senior High School" until the opening of Highland Hills Middle School in 2004.

Beginning 
Floyd Central was once considered to be a rural farming community school, but as it has developed, potential inhabitants now have a variety of housing options, such as horse farms, subdivisions, or small towns. One of two high schools in Floyd County, Floyd Central is a member of the New Albany-Floyd County Consolidated School Corporation, which enrolls around 11,000 students. New Albany is the other high school. The school mascot of Floyd Central is a Scottish soldier called the Highlander, and the school's colors are green, gold, and white. The Minnesota Rouser is the school's fight song.

Construction 
The school board and Glen Barkes, the superintendent, started making plans for Floyd Central Junior/Senior High School in the early 1960s. The three main factors that led to the decision to construct a new high school were an expanded high school curriculum, lower transportation expenses, and an expanding school corporation. Schools in Floyd County were beginning to become overcrowded as a result of population growth. Around 9,800 pupils were anticipated to enroll on the first day of classes in New Albany Floyd County Schools in 1961, an increase of 200 students over the previous year. As Interstate Highway 64 was being built through the county, it was anticipated that this boom would continue.

Georgetown High School, the county's secondary high school at the time, had few resources to give its students. With the revised proposal, Georgetown may become an elementary school and a new high school might be built to meet the needs of the expanding student body. The school board's budget was about $2,250,000 when it initially started drafting a plan. The 50-acre site's construction began in 1965. Floyd Central has undergone extensive changes since the initial building of the school in 1970, 1984, 2004, and most recently in 2010.

Now 
A planetarium, computer labs, a media center, a radio/TV studio, two gyms, an auditorium, an ROTC building, a small theater, and a restaurant with outdoor seating are all included in the eight acres that make up the building. The campus's total site size is 97.25 acres thanks to the Les Wright Athletic Complex, which also houses the Ron Weigleb Football Stadium, two soccer fields, two softball courts, two baseball diamonds, practice fields, and concession areas.

Athletics
The girls' cross country team is the most decorated, with four state titles from 1989 through 1992. The boys cross country team won the state championship in 1991. Boys golf won state titles in 2005-06 and 2006-07. Boys basketball has made 2 appearances in the state finals, in 1971 with the "Superhicks" and in 1989 with Indiana Mr. Basketball and Trestor Award Winner Pat Graham.

The Floyd Central Cheerleaders took home a State Title in 2020.

Performing arts
Floyd Central Theater was recognized in 2007 by the Educational Theater Association as one of the top five theater programs in the nation. They have also received four invitations to represent Indiana at The International Fringe Festival in Edinburgh, Scotland. In the 2017-2018 school year the theatre program was asked by The Walt Disney Company to produce a demo version of the hit Broadway musical Newsies to see how they could make the Broadway play work for a high school production. The Acappella Choir won the ISSMA State Championship in 2015, and has been a state finalist almost all years in recent decades. The orchestra won the 1995 and 2017 ISSMA State Championships and  has qualified for the ISSMA state finals 30 years in a row. In addition to marching and symphonic band, Floyd Central has a volunteer pep band to play at basketball games, a jazz ensemble, and strong winter percussion/winter guard programs. The music department as a whole has been nationally recognized twice as a Grammy School, being designated as a Grammy Signature Gold Award School in 1998-1999 and as a Grammy Signature School in 2002.  The school also operates WNAS-TV and WNAS-FM, in cooperation with New Albany High School.

See also
 List of high schools in Indiana
 New Albany-Floyd County Schools
 FCHS 2021-22 Planner and Handbook

References

External links
School website
School newspaper (The Bagpiper)
FCHS at page Mustang.doe.state.in.us

Public high schools in Indiana
Schools in Floyd County, Indiana
Educational institutions established in 1967
1967 establishments in Indiana